"Du swipa höger" is the debut single by Swedish singer Emil Berg, which was released on 12 June 2015 by Giant Records. The song peaked at number two on the Swedish Singles Chart.

Music video
The music video for the song was directed by Gustav Andersson and Martin Hultgren and uploaded by Emil Berg on 15 July 2015.

Charts

Weekly charts

Year-end charts

Certifications

Release history

References

External links
 

Swedish pop songs
2015 singles
2015 songs
Giant Records (Warner) singles
Song articles with missing songwriters